Polygamy is illegal in Uzbekistan (punishable by up to three years imprisonment) and the nation does not provide for polygamous marriages under civil law or customary law. Despite such illegalities, there have been recent debates about the legislation of polygamous marriages under civil law; though such measure have always failed to pass.

References 

Uzbekistan
Marriage, unions and partnerships in Uzbekistan